Rhys Davids as a surname may refer to:
Thomas William Rhys Davids, British scholar, founder and president of the Pāli Text Society, husband of next
Caroline Augusta Foley Rhys Davids, British scholar, second president of the Pāli Text Society, wife of previous
Arthur Rhys Davids, British ace of World War I, son of previous couple